Dobrin Dimitrov Vekilov (born May 7, 1966) (Bulgarian Cyrillic: Добрин Димитров Векилов), best known by his stage name Doni (Bulgarian Cyrillic: Дони), is a Bulgarian pop singer, composer and actor.

Biography

Prior to turning to singing, Doni started his education as a pharmacist but his passion for music prevailed. He began studying music in 1988 and started his professional music career in the 1990s as a member of the bands "Atlas" and "Medikus". Doni subsequently formed one of the most successful musical duos in Bulgaria with Momchil Kolev or simply Momchil.

Vekilov has worked together in a musical capacity with and is married to Antoaneta Dobreva, better known by her stage name Neti, and they have a daughter.

In his career so far, Vekilov has made 500 songs, composing more than 250 of them, while the number of those for which he has been the text writer exceeds 300.

Doni is vegetarian as well as a tibetan buddhist .

He has from time to time been active in Bulgarian politics.

References

External links
Official website

1967 births
Living people
20th-century Bulgarian male singers
Bulgarian pop singers
Bulgarian composers
Musicians from Sofia